The United States Navy sent their naval forces in the Red Sea and Persian Gulf including six Aircraft Carriers to take part in Operation Desert Storm, including others that arrived before or after the war started and ended (as part of Operation Southern Watch).

Units in Operation Desert Shield 
Before Operation Desert Storm, the US Navy helped with the buildup of forces in the Middle East. Both Independence and Dwight D. Eisenhower didn't take part in the actual conflict.

Battle Group Delta'* (Relieved by USS Midway on November 1 1990) - Persian Gulf ===

 USS Independence CV-62
 USS Antietam CG-54

=== USS Dwight D. Eisenhower CVN-69 (August 8 to 24th) - Persian Gulf ===

== Units in Operation Desert Storm ==

===  Battle Group Alfa (October 2, 1990 to April 17, 1991 - Persian Gulf) ===

 USS Midway CV-41 (Flagship of Battle Force Zulu) 
 USS Bunker Hill CG-52
 USS Mobile Bay CG-53
 USS Hewitt DD-966
 USS Oldendorf DD-972
 USS Curtis FFG-38
 USS Rodney M. Davis FFG-60

Unlike the other carriers in the Gulf War, USS Midway couldn't carry the S-3 Viking or the F-14 Tomcat due to her size constraints meaning the ship instead had three F/A-18 squadrons.

=== Saratoga Carrier Battlegroup (August 7, 1990 to March 28, 1991) - Red Sea ===

 USS Saratoga CV-60
 USS Biddle CG-34
 USS Philippine Sea CG-58
 USS Spruance DD-963
 USS Sampson DDG-10
 USS Elmer Montgomery FF-1082
 USS Thomas C. Hart FF-1092

=== Battle Group Echo (December 8, 1990 - June 8 1991) - Persian Gulf ===

 USS Ranger CV-61
 USS Valley Forge CG-50
 USS Chosin CG-62
 USS Kinkaid DD-965
 USS Kirk FF-1087

USS Ranger had a very different air wing compared to most carriers in the Gulf War as it was in the 'Grumman Air Wing' format. This meant it didn't have the F/A-18 or A-7E Corsair, which were the 2 different light attack aircraft used on many of the carriers, replacing them with 2 A-6E intruder squadrons.

=== USS America CV-66 (December 28, 1990 - April 18, 1991) - Red Sea (Later Persian Gulf) ===
USS America crossed through the Suez Canal on January 15 1991, the same day the UN deadline for Iraq leaving Kuwait ended. 

At daylight on January 19 1991 (2 days after the first night), CVW-1 conducted their first strikes against Iraq. 

=== USS John F. Kennedy CV-67 (August 15, 1990 - March 28, 1991) - Red Sea===

=== USS Theodore Roosevelt CVN-71 (December 28, 1990 - June 28, 1991) - Persian Gulf (Later Red Sea) ===
USS Theodore Roosevelt launched her first strikes two days after the first night on the morning of January 19 1991. After the Gulf War, Theodore Roosevelt took part in Operation Provide Comfort after transiting the Suez Canal on April 20, 1991.

== Units in Operation Southern Watch (1991-2003) ==

=== USS Ranger CV-61 ===
This was the last cruise for USS Ranger.

=== USS Independence CV-62 ===
USS Independence replaced USS Midway as the forward deployed carrier of the United States 7th Fleet.

=== USS Kitty Hawk CV-63 ===

In 1998, Kitty Hawk would replace the Independence as the forward deployed carrier in Japan.

=== USS Constellation CV-64 ===

=== USS Enterprise CVN-65 ===

=== USS Nimitz CVN-68 ===

=== USS Carl Vinson CVN-70 ===

==== Carl Vinson Carrier Battlegroup - (February 17, 1994 - August 17, 1994)''' ====

 USS Carl Vinson CVN-70
 USS Arkansas CGN-41
 USS Antietam CG-54
 USS Paul F. Foster DD-964
 USS Reuben James FFG-57
 USS Asheville SSN-758

USS Carl Vinson also took part in Operation Desert Fox.

=== USS Theodore Roosevelt CVN-71 ===

=== USS Abraham Lincoln CVN-72 ===

== Units in Operation Provide Comfort (1991-1996) and Operation Northern Watch (1997-2003) ==

=== USS Forrestal CV-59 ===
This was USS Forrestal's last deployment.

=== USS Theodore Roosevelt'' CVN-71

References 

Gulf War
Orders of battle
Air units and formations of the United States Navy
Units and formations of the United States Navy by war
Military units and formations of the United States in the Gulf War
Iraq War